Raymond Novak (born March 30, 1977) is a Canadian political strategist, who was appointed as Stephen Harper's fourth Chief of Staff on May 19, 2013, following the dismissal of Nigel Wright. He was the 14th person to serve as Chief of Staff since the creation of the position. He served in the role until November 4, 2015 following the defeat of the Harper Government.

Educated in political science at the University of Western Ontario and the University of Calgary, Novak first entered politics as an intern in the offices of Preston Manning and Rob Anders. He was later a researcher for the National Citizens Coalition while Stephen Harper was leading the organization. When Harper moved into Stornoway, Novak lived rent-free in an apartment above the official residence's garage.

Ray Novak was employed in the Prime Minister's Office since Harper's entry in 2006, undertaking several roles.

References 

1977 births
Living people
Chiefs of staff of the Canadian Prime Minister's Office
Canadian political consultants
University of Western Ontario alumni
University of Calgary alumni
Canadian monarchists